Gloeostereum is a genus of fungi in the family Cyphellaceae. This is a monotypic genus, containing the single species Gloeostereum incarnatum, an edible mushroom native to China. In Chinese culture, it is called yú'ěr (榆 耳; literally "elm ear"). It is sometimes included in a vegetarian dish called Buddha's delight.

See also
 List of Agaricales genera

External links
 Gloeostereum at Index Fungorum

Chinese edible mushrooms
Cyphellaceae
Monotypic Basidiomycota genera
Taxa named by Sanshi Imai
Taxa described in 1933